Youth Communication is a 501(c)(3) nonprofit youth media organization based in New York City that promotes youth literacy and civic engagement through youth-led media. The organization was founded in 1980 by youth rights pioneer Keith Hefner, who won a MacArthur Fellowship for his work with Youth Communication in 1989.

About
Youth Communication seeks to help marginalized youth develop their full potential through reading and writing so that they can succeed in school and at work and contribute to their communities. It publishes anthologies of stories by teens, many of which also include lesson guides to help teachers and other adults use the stories to help teens strengthen reading, writing, and social/emotional skills. Youth Communication also publishes two print magazines and associated websites: YCteen (formerly called New Youth Connections), a general interest magazine for urban teens; and Represent (formerly Foster Care Youth United), a magazine written by and for young people in foster care. Hundreds of stories and lessons by teens in the program are also available on the organization's websites.

Youth Communication counts many notable alumni, including the authors Edwidge Danticat (Breath Eyes Memory), Veronica Chambers (Mama's Girl), and Gina Trapani (LifeHacker), the hip hop writer and actor Bönz Malone, and the reporters Rachel Swarns (The New York Times), and Mohamad Bazzi (Newsday).

Youth Communication has won numerous awards for its educational publications. In 2001 it won a Coming Up Taller Award  from the National Endowments for the Arts and the Humanities. In 2007, it was among over 530 New York City arts and social service institutions to receive part of a $20 million grant from the Carnegie Corporation, which was made possible through a donation by New York City mayor Michael Bloomberg.

It has won more than a dozen Distinguished Achievement Awards from the Association of Educational Publishers, including a 2011 award for best high school curriculum in the Health and Character Education category for Real Men, its program on masculinity for urban teens.

In 2006, the organization began producing video stories, more than 40 of which are on its YouTube site. They include news videos, personal stories, and "story behind the story" videos in which the teen authors talk about the writing process and why they wrote their stories. Youth Communication has also worked with outside directors. Ric Burns directed a video about the organization called Changing Lives, One Story at a Time, and Michael "Boogie" Pinckney directed Alternative High, a story about one Youth Communication writer's journey from high school dropout to high school principal that accompanies the Real Men program.

References

External links
 Youth Communication website.
 YCteen website
 Represent website

Organizations based in New York City
Youth organizations based in New York City
Education in New York City
Youth-led media
Non-profit organizations based in New York City